The 2018–19 Arkansas State Red Wolves men's basketball team represents Arkansas State University during the 2018–19 NCAA Division I men's basketball season. The Red Wolves, led by second-year head coach Mike Balado, play their home games at the First National Bank Arena in Jonesboro, Arkansas as members of the Sun Belt Conference.

Previous season
The Red Wolves finished the 2017–18 season 11–21, 6–12 in Sun Belt play to finish in 11th place. They lost in the first round of the Sun Belt tournament to Louisiana–Monroe.

Roster

Schedule and results

|-
!colspan=9 style=| Exhibition

|-
!colspan=9 style=| Non-conference regular season

|-
!colspan=9 style=| Sun Belt Conference regular season

|-
!colspan=9 style=| Sun Belt tournament

References

Arkansas State Red Wolves men's basketball seasons
Arkansas State
Arkansas State
Arkansas State